Ivan Yuryevich Kurdanin (born 24 March 1984) is a former Russian professional football player.

Club career
He made his debut for the senior squad of FC Amkar Perm on 20 September 2006 in the Russian Cup game against FC Angusht Nazran.

He made his Russian Football National League debut for FC Volga Ulyanovsk on 14 June 2008 in a game against FC Rostov. He played 2 seasons in the FNL for Volga Ulyanovsk and FC Mordovia Saransk.

External links
 
 

1984 births
People from Krasnogorsk, Moscow Oblast
Living people
Russian footballers
Association football defenders
FC Asmaral Moscow players
FC Amkar Perm players
FC Spartak Kostroma players
FC Mordovia Saransk players
FC Torpedo Moscow players
FC Volga Ulyanovsk players
Sportspeople from Moscow Oblast